Ismaïla Sy (born May 29, 1979 in Versailles. France) is a French basketball player who played for French Pro A league clubs Nancy during 2003-2004 season, Brest during 2005-2006 season and Hyeres-Toulon during 2007-2008 season.

References

www.lnb.fr

French men's basketball players
1979 births
Living people
Sportspeople from Versailles, Yvelines
HTV Basket players